Rust de Winter Nature Reserve encloses Rust de Winter Dam near Hammanskraal in southern Limpopo province, South Africa.

Wildlife 
Game animals include waterbuck, zebra, common warthog, aardvark, crocodile, bushpig and kudu.

See also 
 Protected areas of South Africa

Nature reserves in South Africa